Polvontosh is an urban-type settlement in Andijan Region, Uzbekistan. It is part of Marhamat District. The town population was 5,445 people in 1989, and 7,800 in 2016.

References

Populated places in Andijan Region
Urban-type settlements in Uzbekistan